Orazio Vecellio (c. 1528–1576) was an Italian painter of the Renaissance period, born in Venice around 1528. The son and pupil of Titian, he distinguished himself as a painter of portraits, some of which were thought little inferior to those of his father. He occasionally painted historical subjects; one of the most important was destroyed in the conflagration in the ducal palace at Venice. He neglected painting to devote himself to alchemy. He died of the plague in Venice, in 1576, the same year as his father.

References

1520s births
1576 deaths
16th-century Italian painters
Italian male painters
Painters from Venice
Italian Renaissance painters
16th-century deaths from plague (disease)